The Görres Society is a German learned society, whose goal is to foster interdisciplinarity and apply scientific principles to different disciplines, based in the Catholic tradition. The Gorres society is divided into 20 sections, in which members meet at the annual general meeting

History
Co-founder, initiator and first president was Georg von Hertling, the later Reich chancellor of Germany.

It was dissolved by the Nazis in 1941, and founded anew in 1948 in Cologne.

Presidents
 Georg von Hertling (1877-1919), politician and philosopher
 Hermann von Grauert (1920–1924), historian
  (1924–1938), church historian and medievalist
  (1940–1941, 1948-1966), legal scholar and politician
 Paul Mikat (1967–2007), legal scholar and politician
  (2007–present), political scientist

References

External links

Learned societies of Germany
Organizations established in 1876
1876 establishments in Germany